A perfect 10 is a score of 10.000 for a single routine in artistic gymnastics, which was once thought to be unattainable—particularly at the Olympic Games—under the code of points set by the International Gymnastics Federation (FIG). It is generally recognized that the first person to score a perfect 10 at the Olympic Games was Romanian Nadia Comăneci, at the 1976 Games in Montreal. Other women who accomplished this feat at the Olympics include Nellie Kim, also in 1976, Mary Lou Retton in 1984, Daniela Silivaș and Yelena Shushunova in 1988, and Lavinia Miloșovici in 1992. The first man to score a perfect 10 is considered to be Alexander Dityatin, at the 1980 Olympics in Moscow. (However, in the 1924 Paris Olympics, 22 men achieved a mark of 10 in rope-climbing, with one Albert Séguin getting a second 10 in the sidehorse vault, events that are no longer part of artistic gymnastics.)

The FIG changed its code of points in 2006. There are now different top scores, all greater than 10, for the various events, based upon difficulty and artistic merit; there is no consistent perfect score. Execution scores are still out of 10, so the theoretical possibility exists for a gymnast to get a partial "perfect 10" (for execution) in addition to whatever maximum number they get for difficulty, but no such score has been awarded in decades.

History
Men's artistic gymnastics had been an Olympic sport since the beginning of the modern games. Women's gymnastics were introduced as a single (team) event in the 1928 games, but were not expanded until the 1952 games, when there were seven events. The International Federation of Gymnastics first drew up a code of points—for men—in 1949.

Although the code of points was based on a maximum of 10, until 1976 it was considered impossible to achieve a score of greater than 9.95, particularly at the Olympic Games.  

At the World Championships or Olympics beginning when increased standardization of competition format and scoring (which was capped at a 10, a trend which would not be changed until 2006) was introduced at the 1952 Olympics, the very highest scores tended to be in the 9.400 - 9.600 range, and over the next few World and Olympic cycles through the 1950, 1960s, and 1970s, the top scores gradually got higher through the 9.700 and 9.800 range.  

During the post-1952 era, a couple of very early scores, essentially extreme outliers, that came very close to the 10.000 mark were Armenian-Soviet Hrant Shahinyan's score of 9.950 on optional rings at the 1952 Olympics and Armenian-Soviet Albert Azaryan's score of 9.950, also on the optional still rings exercise, at the 1954 World Championships.  On the men's side, these scores might not have been surpassed, or even equaled, at a World Championships or Olympics until 1980, as even scores of 9.900 were extremely rare and, in some Worlds and Olympics throughout the 1950s -1970s, scores of 9.900 seem to have been non-existent for the men.     

One early example of a woman gymnast breaking the 9.900 score barrier at a World Championships or Olympics in the post-1952 era was Soviet Larisa Latynina at the 1962 World Artistic Gymnastics Championships  Another of the earliest was Soviet Zinaida Druzhinina-Voronina who scored a 9.933 at the 1966 World Championships in the Floor Exercise Event Finals, the very highest mark of any competitor at that competition. 

An often glossed-over fact when discussing the Perfect 10 is that Věra Čáslavská of Czechoslovakia was the first gymnast to achieve perfect 10s at a major competition in the post-1952 era, which she did twice at the 1967 European Championships, which were displayed on a manual scoreboard. Prior to the 1976 Olympics in Montreal, Omega, the official timers, asked the International Olympic Committee how many digits it should allow on the electronic scoreboard, and were told that three digits would be sufficient, as a score of 10.00 would not be possible.

On 18 July 1976, 14-year-old Romanian gymnast Nadia Comăneci performed in the uneven bars event, and was awarded a score of 10. Because the scoreboard only allowed three digits, it had to display her score as 1.00. This led to confusion, with even Comăneci unsure of what it meant, until the announcer informed the elated crowd that she had scored a perfect 10. An iconic press photograph (pictured above) shows a beaming Comăneci, arms upraised, beside the scoreboard. Comăneci scored a total of seven 10s at the 1976 Olympics—four on the uneven bars and three on the balance beam. Her main rival, Soviet Nelli Kim, scored two 10s in the same competition, in the vault and floor exercise. Comăneci's coach, Béla Károlyi, having defected to the United States in 1981, subsequently coached Mary Lou Retton to gold at the 1984 Olympics in Los Angeles, where she scored 10s in the vault and floor exercise.

The first man to score a perfect 10 in Olympic competition was the Soviet Alexander Dityatin, who received the score in the vault on the way to a record-breaking eight medals in the 1980 Olympics in Moscow. Among other men to achieve the score was Comăneci's future husband, Bart Conner, who received two 10s in Los Angeles in 1984.

Change in scoring
The code of points came under review as a result of separate incidents during the 2004 Summer Olympics in Athens, in which gymnasts were believed to have received excessively low scores. A new scoring system was introduced in 2006. It consists of an "A" score, based on the difficulty of elements, and a "B" score, based on artistic impression. While the B score still has a maximum of 10, it is only a part of the overall score.

The change had its share of critics. Béla Károlyi said of it: "It's crazy, terrible, the stupidest thing that ever happened to the sport of gymnastics.". Mary Lou Retton remarked: "It's hard to understand. I don't even understand it." Nadia Comăneci commented, "It's so hard to define sports like ours and we had something unique. The 10, it was ours first and now you give it away."

List of perfect 10s
This list may be incomplete.

Olympics

Paris 1924
Twenty-two men in rope-climbing, with one Albert Séguin getting a second 10.0 in the sidehorse vault

Montreal 1976

Women 

 Nadia Comăneci - team compulsory uneven bars, team optional uneven bars, team optional balance beam, all around uneven bars, all around balance beam, uneven bars event final, balance beam event final
 Nellie Kim - all around vault, floor exercise event final 

(Olympic database; Women's individual results; women's all-around results; women's team results)

Moscow 1980

Men 

 Alexander Dityatin - all around vault
 Stoyan Deltchev - all around rings
 Aleksandr Tkachyov - all around high bar
 Michael Nikolay - all around pommel horse
 Zoltán Magyar - all around pommel horse, pommel horse event final

(Men's all-around results; men's individual event results)

Women 

 Natalia Shaposhnikova - team compulsory vault
 Yelena Davydova - team optional floor exercise
 Emilia Eberle - team optional uneven bars
 Nadia Comăneci - team compulsory balance beam, all around uneven bars
 Melita Ruhn - team optional vault
 Maxi Gnauck - team optional uneven bars

Los Angeles 1984

Men 

 Peter Vidmar - team compulsory pommel horse, all around high bar, pommel horse event final
 Bart Conner - team optional parallel bars, parallel bars event final
 Mitch Gaylord - team compulsory parallel bars, team optional rings
 Tim Daggett - team optional high bar
 Li Ning - team compulsory pommel horse, team optional rings, floor exercise event final, pommel horse event final
 Tong Fei - team compulsory high bar, team optional rings, all around high bar, high bar event final
 Xu Zhiqiang - team compulsory high bar
 Lou Yun - team compulsory vault, team optional vault
 Li Xiaoping - team compulsory pommel horse
 Koji Gushiken - team compulsory high bar, all around vault, high bar event final
 Shinji Morisue - team compulsory high bar, team optional high bar, high bar event final
 Nobuyuki Kajitani - parallel bars event final

Women 

 Ecaterina Szabo - team compulsory floor exercise, team optional vault, all around balance beam, floor exercise event final
 Simona Păucă - team optional balance beam
 Mary Lou Retton - team optional vault, all around vault, all around floor exercise
 Julianne McNamara - team optional uneven bars, team optional floor exercise, all around uneven bars, uneven bars event final, floor exercise event final
 Ma Yanhong - team optional uneven bars, all around uneven bars, uneven bars event final

(Men's results; women's results)

Seoul 1988

Men 

 Vladimir Artemov - team compulsory parallel bars, team optional high bar, all around parallel bars, all around high bar
 Valeri Liukin - team optional pommel horse, team optional parallel bars, all around high bar
 Dmitry Bilozerchev - team optional pommel horse, team optional rings, all around pommel horse, all around rings, all around vault, pommel horse event final
 Sergei Kharkov - team optional floor exercise
 Koichi Mizushima - team optional pommel horse
 Daisuke Nishikawa - team optional pommel horse
 Lubomir Geraskov - team optional pommel horse, pommel horse event final
 Zsolt Borkai - team optional pommel horse, pommel horse event final
 Holger Behrendt - team optional rings
 Sylvio Kroll - all around pommel horse
 György Guczoghy - all around pommel horse
 Csaba Fajkusz - all around high bar

Women 

 Yelena Shushunova - team compulsory vault, team optional vault, team optional uneven bars, team optional floor exercise, all around vault, all around floor exercise, uneven bars event final
 Daniela Silivaș - team compulsory uneven bars, team compulsory floor exercise, team optionals uneven bars, team optionals balance beam, all around uneven bars, all around floor exercise, uneven bars event final
 Dagmar Kersten - team compulsory uneven bars, uneven bars event final

(Men's results; women's results)

Barcelona 1992

Women 

 Lu Li - uneven bars event final
 Lavinia Miloșovici - floor exercise event final

(Women's results)

Alternate Olympics

Olomouc 1984

Men 

 Dmitry Bilozerchev - team optional pommel horse, team optional rings, team optional parallel bars, team optional high bar, all around pommel horse, all around vault, all around parallel bars, all around high bar, pommel horse event final, rings event final, high bar event final
 Vladimir Artemov - team optional pommel horse, team optional rings, team optional vault, all around rings
 Yuri Balbanov - team compulsory rings, team optional high bar, all around parallel bars
 Holger Behrendt - team optional rings
 Sylvio Kroll - team compulsory vault, team optional vault, vault event final
 Roland Brückner - team optional floor exercise

Women 

 Olga Mostepanova - team compulsory vault, team compulsory uneven bars, team compulsory balance beam, team optional vault, team optional balance beam, team optional floor exercise, all around vault, all around uneven bars, all around balance beam, all around floor exercise, balance beam event final, floor exercise event final
 Natalia Yurchenko - team compulsory uneven bars, team optional vault, all around vault, all around balance beam, uneven bars event final
 Yelena Shushunova - team optional vault
 Maxi Gnauck - team compulsory uneven bars, team optional vault, team optional uneven bars, all around floor exercise, uneven bars event final, floor exercise event final
 Gabriele Fähnrich - team compulsory uneven bars, uneven bars event final
 Hana Říčná - team optional balance beam, all around vault, all around uneven bars
 Martina Koblizkova - team optional vault
 Alena Dřevjaná - all around balance beam
 Franka Voigt - all around vault
 Boriana Stoyanova - all around uneven bars
 Miroslava Koblizkova - all around uneven bars

Goodwill Games

1986 Goodwill Games

Women 
Yelena Shushunova - all around vault
Oksana Omelianchik - all around floor exercise

1990 Goodwill Games

Women 

 Natalia Kalinina - all around floor exercise

World Championships

1934 World Championships 

 Eugen Mack - vault (perfect 20 out of 20)

1950 World Championships 

 Hans Eugster - compulsory parallel bars

1981 World Championships

Men 

 Aleksandr Tkachyov - team optional high bar, high bar event final
 Artur Akopyan - team optional high bar, high bar event final
 Tong Fei - team optional high bar, all around high bar
 Bogdan Makuts - all around high bar
 Sergio Saurez - all around high bar
 Li Xiaoping - pommel horse event final
 Michael Nikolay - pommel horse event final
 György Guczoghy - pommel horse event final
 Yuri Korolev - pommel horse event final
 Eberhard Gienger - high bar event final
 Kiyoshi Goto - high bar event final

Women 

 Olga Bicherova - all around vault
 Maxi Gnauck - uneven bars event final

1983 World Championships

Men 

 Tong Fei - team compulsory parallel bars, floor exercise event final
 Li Ning - team optional rings, pommel horse event final
 Lou Yun - team optional parallel bars, parallel bars event final
 Dmitry Bilozerchev - team compulsory pommel horse, team optional pommel horse, all around floor exercise, all around vault, all around high bar, pommel horse event final, rings event final, high bar event final
 Vladimir Artemov - team optional parallel bars, parallel bars event final
 Shinji Morisue - team optional high bar
 György Guczoghy - all around pommel horse, pommel horse event final
 Alexander Pogorelov - all around rings
 Li Xiaoping - pommel horse event final
 Koji Gushiken - rings event final
 Koji Sotomura - rings event final

Women 

 Natalia Yurchenko - team optional vault, team optional balance beam, all around vault, all around floor exercise
 Olga Mostepanova - team optional vault, all around vault, floor exercise event final
 Olga Bicherova - team optional vault
 Lavinia Agache - team optional uneven bars
 Ecaterina Szabo - team optional uneven bars, team optional floor exercise, all around vault, all around floor exercise, floor exercise event final
 Mirela Barbălată - team optional vault
 Maxi Gnauck - team optional uneven bars, all around uneven bars, uneven bars event final

1985 World Championships

Men 

 Tong Fei - team optional high bar

Women 

 Olga Mostepanova - team compulsory balance beam
 Oksana Omelianchik - team optional floor exercise, floor exercise event final
 Yelena Shushunova - team optional floor exercise
 Gabriele Fähnrich - team compulsory uneven bars
 Daniela Silivaș - balance beam event final

1987 World Championships

Men 

 Xu Zhiqiang - team optional parallel bars
 Lou Yun - team optional floor exercise, floor exercise event final
 Sylvio Kroll - team optional vault, all around vault
 Yuri Korolev - all around vault

Women 

 Aurelia Dobre - team optional vault, team optional balance beam, team optional floor exercise, all around vault, balance beam event final
 Daniela Silivaș - team compulsory balance beam, team compulsory floor exercise, team optional uneven bars, team optional floor exercise, floor exercise event final
 Camelia Voinea - team optional floor exercise
 Eugenia Golea - team optional vault 
 Yelena Shushunova - team compulsory vault, team compulsory floor exercise, team optional floor exercise, all around floor exercise, floor exercise event final
 Dörte Thümmler - team optional uneven bars
 Gabriele Fähnrich - team optional uneven bars
 Fan Di - team optional uneven bars

1989 World Championships

Men 

 Valentin Mogilny - team optional pommel horse, all around pommel horse, pommel horse event final

Women 

 Natalia Laschenova - team optional vault, all around vault, all around uneven bars
 Svetlana Boginskaya - team optional uneven bars, team optional floor exercise, all around vault, all around floor exercise, floor exercise event final
 Olesya Dudnik - team compulsory floor exercise, team optional vault, team optional balance beam
 Daniela Silivaș - team compulsory vault, team optional uneven bars, team optional floor exercise, uneven bars event final, floor exercise event final
 Cristina Bontaș - all around floor exercise
 Fan Di - uneven bars event final

1991 World Championships

Women 

 Kim Zmeskal - team optional vault
 Kim Gwang-Suk - uneven bars event final

European Championships

1967 European Championships

Women 
Věra Čáslavská - balance beam event final, floor exercise event final

1977 European Championships

Women 

 Nadia Comăneci - balance beam event final

1981 European Championships

Women 
Maxi Gnauck - uneven bars event final

1985 European Championships

Women 

 Yelena Shushunova - all around vault
 Oksana Omelianchik - floor exercise event final

1987 European Championships

Women 

 Daniela Silivaș - all around floor exercise, floor exercise event final

1989 European Championships

Women 
Svetlana Boginskaya - all around floor exercise, floor exercise event final
Olga Strazheva - all around uneven bars
Daniela Silivaș - floor exercise event final

1990 European Championships

Women 

 Svetlana Boginskaya - all around vault, balance beam event final, floor exercise event final

U.S. National Championships

1984 National Championships

Men 

 Mitch Gaylord - all around optional high bar

Women 

 Mary Lou Retton - all around optional vault, floor exercise event final

1988 National Championships

Men 

 Dan Hayden - all around compulsory parallel bars

1990 National Championships

Men 

 Bill Roth - all around optional high bar

1992 National Championships

Women 

 Kim Zmeskal - all around optional vault

U.S. Olympic Trials

1984 Olympic Trials

Men 

 Peter Vidmar - optional high bar
 Mitch Gaylord - optional parallel bars
 Bart Conner - compulsory parallel bars

1988 Olympic Trials

Women 

 Rhonda Faehn - optional vault
 Joyce Wilborn - compulsory vault

1992 Olympic Trials

Women 

 Kim Zmeskal - optional vault

Moscow News/World Stars

1979 Moscow News

Women 

 Stella Zakharova - all around floor exercise

1988 Moscow News

Women 

 Yelena Shushunova - all around balance beam

1989 Moscow News

Women 

 Svetlana Boginskaya - all around vault
 Yulia Kut - uneven bars event final

1991 World Stars

Men 

 Sergey Kharkov - all around high bar
 Valeri Liukin - all around rings

1992 World Stars

Women 

 Tatiana Gutsu - all around uneven bars

American Cup

New York City 1976

Women 
Nadia Comăneci - team optional vault, all around floor exercise

New York City 1980

Men 

 Kurt Thomas - all around high bar

New York City 1984

Men 

 Peter Vidmar - all around pommel horse

Women 

 Mary Lou Retton - team optional floor exercise, all around vault
 Julianne McNamara - team optional uneven bars, all around uneven bars

Orlando 1991

Women 

 Kim Zmeskal - all around floor exercise
 Betty Okino - all around vault

Orlando 1992

Men 

 Scott Keswick - all around rings

European Cup

1988 European Cup

Women 

 Yelena Shevchenko - all around floor exercise

DTB Cup

1984 DTB Cup

Women 

 Maxi Gnauck - all around uneven bars, all around floor exercise, uneven bars event final, floor exercise event final

1987 DTB Cup

Men 

 Nicusor Pascu - all around high bar

1988 DTB Cup

Men 

 Marius Gherman - all around high bar

Women 

 Svetlana Boginskaya - all around vault

1989 DTB Cup

Women 

 Natalia Lashchenova - all around vault

Cottbus International

1984 Cottbus International

Women 

 Maxi Gnauck - all around floor exercise
 Gabriele Fähnrich - all around uneven bars

1985 Cottbus International

Women 

 Maxi Gnauck - floor exercise event final

1992 Cottbus International

Women 

 Henrietta Ónodi - floor exercise event final

World Cup

1979 World Cup

Women 

 Nadia Comăneci - all around floor exercise, floor exercise event final
 Stella Zakharova - floor exercise event final

1982 World Cup

Men 

 Li Ning - all around high bar

1986 World Cup

Women 

 Yelena Shushunova - all around vault

Tokyo Cup

1985 Tokyo Cup

Women 

 Ulrike Klotz - floor exercise event final

1988 Tokyo Cup

Women 

 Daniela Silivaș - uneven bars event final, floor exercise event final
 Svetlana Ivanova - floor exercise event final

Chunichi Cup

1976 Chunichi Cup

Women 

 Nadia Comăneci - all around uneven bars, all around floor exercise

1988 Chunichi Cup

Women 

 Daniela Silivaș - floor exercise event final
 Svetlana Boginskaya - floor exercise event final

University Games

1987 University Games

Women 

 Yelena Shushunova - all around uneven bars, all around balance beam, all around floor exercise

"Meta-Perfect" Scores of 20, 30, and 40 

Although virtually hundreds of perfect scores of 10 were given at various levels of competition throughout the 1970s, 1980s, and 1990s, "meta-perfect" scores of 20, 30, or 40 were much, much more rare.  A "meta-perfect" score would be an instance where a gymnast received multiple perfect scores of 10 throughout a competition on an apparatus (culminating in an official "meta-perfect" score of 20 in the Event Finals, depending upon the era and competition), or on every apparatus in a segment of a competition (which would result in an official "meta-perfect" score of 60 for a male gymnast or 40 for female gymnast, depending upon the era and competition).  

Three possible scenarios in which to create a "meta-perfect score", that have occurred, would then be:  1) to achieve perfect 10s on every apparatus throughout a segment of a competition (Team Compulsories, Team Optionals, or All-Around) which would post an official "meta-perfect" score of either 60 for the men or 40 for the women, depending upon the era and competition; 2) to achieve perfect 10s on all performances on an apparatus throughout every segment of a competition (Team Compulsories, Optionals, All-around, and Event Finals), which would officially post a "meta-perfect" score of 20 in Event Finals, depending upon the era and competition; and 3) to achieve perfect 10s on all optionals performances on an apparatus (team optionals, all-around (if competed in), event finals), which might or might not post an official "meta-perfect" score, depending upon the competition and era - but this is a possibly necessary scenario to articulate because perfect scores of 10 were given much less often to compulsory routines than to optional routines, for a number of reasons.  Olga Mostepanova seems to have been the only gymnast to do #1 at a major international competition.  Svetlana Boginskaya, Nadia Comăneci, Maxi Gnauck, Olga Mostepanova, and Daniela Silivaș are women who have done this more than once.  Dmitry Bilozerchev has done this probably more (4) times than any other man.

No score of "30" (listed several times below) would ever have been an officially posted score to designate "meta-perfection" on an apparatus.  This is merely a designation of either 1) "meta-perfection" on an apparatus in both phases of the team competition (compulsories and optionals) as well as event finals, but not in the all-around, and this is worth articulating relative to listed "meta-perfect" scores of 40 because the gymnast in question might not have qualified to the all-around, therefore no opportunity to achieve a theoretical "meta-perfect" score of 40/40; OR 2) "meta-perfection" on all optionals performance on an apparatus (see scenario #3, above).

Olympics

1976 Olympics 

 Nadia Comăneci - 40/40 on Uneven Bars (every segment of the competition), 30/40 on Balance Beam (all optional routines - Team Optionals, All-Around, Event Finals)

1984 Olympics 

 Ma Yanhong - 30/40 on Uneven Bars (all optional routines - Team Optionals, All-Around, Event Finals)
 Julianne McNamara - 30/40 on Uneven Bars (all optional routines - Team Optionals, All-Around, Event Finals)
 Shinji Morisue - 30/30 on Horizontal Bar (Team Compulsories, Team Optionals, Event Finals; he did not compete in the all-around, so no opportunity to achieve 40/40, but he did get a 10 every time he competed on the apparatus)

1988 Olympics 

 Dmitry Bilozerchev - 30/40 on Pommel Horse (all optional routines - Team Optionals, All-Around, Event Finals)
 Daniela Silivaș - 40/40 on Uneven Bars (every segment of the competition)

Alternate Olympics

Olomouc 1984 

 Dmitry Bilozerchev - 30/40 on Pommel Horse (all optional routines - Team Optionals, All-Around, Event Finals), 30/40 on Horizontal Bar (all optional routines - Team Optionals, All-Around, Event Finals)
 Maxi Gnauck - 30/40 on Uneven Bars (in Team Compulsories, Team Optionals, and Event Finals; not a 10 in the All-Around, but a 10 in both segments of the team competition that carried over to Event Finals where Gnauck also got another 10 to create a "meta-perfect" score)
 Olga Mostepanova - 40/40 in the All-Around (all 4 apparatuses), 40/40 on Balance Beam (in every segment of the competition), 30/40 on Floor Exercise (all optional routines - Team Optionals, All-Around, Event Finals)

World Championships

1934 Worlds 

 Eugen Mack - 20/20 on Vault (exact details unknown but all of the highest scores in the competition were in the 18s and 19s, and his was the only 20)

1981 Worlds 

 Artur Akopyan - 20/30 on Horizontal Bar (both optional routines in Team Optionals and Event Finals - did not compete All-Around)
 Aleksandr Tkachyov (Tkachev) - 20/30 (both optional routines in Team Optionals and Event Finals - did not compete All-Around)

1983 Worlds 

 Vladimir Artemov - 20/30 on Parallel Bars (both optional routines - Team Optionals, Event Finals - did not compete All-Around)
 Dmitry Bilozerchev - 30/40 on Pommel Horse (not in the All-Around, but in both Team Compulsories and Team Optionals which carried over to Event Finals where he also got a 10, creating a "meta-perfect" score)
 Maxi Gnauck - 30/40 on Uneven Bars (all optional routines - Team Optionals, All-Around, Event Finals)
 Ekaterina Szabo - 30/40 on Floor Exercise (all optional routines - Team Optionals, All-Around, Event Finals)

1987 Worlds 

 Yelena Shushunova - 40/40 on Floor Exercise (in every segment of the competition)
 Daniela Silivaș - 30/40 on Floor Exercise (not in the All-Around, but in both Team Compulsories and Team Optionals which carried over to Event Finals where she got also got a 10, creating a "meta-perfect" score)

1989 Worlds 

 Svetlana Boginskaya - 30/40 on Floor Exercise (all optional routines - Team Optionals, All-Around, Event Finals)
 Valentin Mogilny - 30/40 on Pommel Horse (all optionals routines - Team Optionals, All-Around, Floor Exercise)

World Cup

1979 World Cup 

 Nadia Comăneci - 20/20 on Floor Exercise (All-Around and Event Finals)

European Championships

1987 Europeans 

 Daniela Silivaș - 20/20 on Floor Exercise (in both the All-Around and Event Finals)

1989 Europeans 

 Svetlana Boginskaya - 20/20 on Floor Exercise (in both the All-Around and Event Finals)

American Cup

1976 American Cup 

 Nadia Comăneci - 20/20 on Vault (in both the Preliminaries and All-Around)

1984 American Cup 

 Julianne McNamara - 20/20 on Uneven Bars (in both the Preliminaries and All-Around)

DTB Cup

1984 DTB Cup 

 Maxi Gnauck - 20/20 on Uneven Bars (All-Around and Event Finals), 20/20 on Floor Exercise (All-Around and Event Finals)

See also 

 List of highest historical scores in figure skating

References 

Gymnastics
Perfect scores in sports